On resignation of Shankarrao Chavan on 26 June 1988, Sharad Pawar was appointed Chief Minister of Maharashtra for the second time. Pawar formed his second ministry, which continued in office until legislative elections in 1990.

Government formation
Pawar had been the State's youngest chief minister from 1978 to 1980, but had since quit Congress to from a separate party. The Pawar-led Indian Congress (Socialist) secured 54 seats in the 1985 legislative elections but his former party maintained its majority. In December 1986, Pawar re-joined Congress, hoping to be made the chief minister. When the incumbent chief minister Shankarrao Chavan was made India's minister of finance, Pawar replaced him.

List of ministers
The following is a list of ministers in Pawar's cabinet:

References

Indian National Congress
1988 in Indian politics
P
Cabinets established in 1988
Cabinets disestablished in 1990